This is a list of the Shire Presidents and Mayors of Ku-ring-gai Council and its predecessors, a local government area of New South Wales, Australia. The official title of Mayors while holding office is: His/Her Worship the Mayor of Ku-ring-gai. The current Mayor of Ku-ring-gai is Cr. Jeff Pettett (Independent), who was elected on 11 January 2022.

Development of the office
Ku-ring-gai was first incorporated on 6 March 1906 as the "Shire of Ku-ring-gai" and the first Shire Council was elected on 24 November 1906. The first leader of the council was elected at the first meeting on 8 December 1906, when Councillor William Cowan was elected as Shire President. There would not be a Deputy President until the council election on 1 March 1920. On 22 September 1928, the Shire of Ku-ring-gai was proclaimed as the "Municipality of Ku-ring-gai" and the titles of 'Shire President' and 'Councillor' were retitled to be 'Mayor' and 'Alderman' respectively. In 1993, with the passing of a new Local Government Act, council was retitled as simply "Ku-ring-gai Council" and Aldermen were retitled as Councillors.

List of incumbents

Presidents/Deputy Presidents of Ku-ring-gai Shire Council, 1906–1928

Mayors/Deputy Mayors of Ku-ring-gai Municipal Council/Ku-ring-gai Council, 1928–present

References

Further reading

External links
Ku-ring-gai Council (Council website)

Ku-ring-gai
Mayors Ku-ring-gai